Hatholmen Lighthouse is a coastal lighthouse in the municipality of Lindesnes in Agder county, Norway. The lighthouse marks the western side of the Mannefjorden which runs north to the town of Mandal (the Ryvingen Lighthouse marks the eastern side of the fjord.

The lighthouse was built in 1867 and it was unmanned and automated in 1984. The light emits two flashes of white, red, or green light (depending on direction) every 10 seconds. The lighthouse is only accessible by boat, but the buildings can be rented out for overnight accommodations.

See also
Lighthouses in Norway
List of lighthouses in Norway

References

Lighthouses in Agder
Lindesnes